ACCENT Speakers Bureau is the student government-run speakers' bureau of the University of Florida. It claims to be the largest student-run speakers' bureau in the United States. The organization is a student government agency.

ACCENT was created in 1967 and its speakers' series was created originally as a symposium, with the first featuring author Ralph Nader and then Vice President Richard Nixon as the headline speakers. The next year, the symposium featured a "liberal versus conservative" debate featuring Harry Goldin and James J. Kilpatrick. The symposium was accompanied by a politically charged magazine which featured writing from political science students and professors at the University of Florida. Over time, ACCENT broke away from the symposium format and turned into a year-long speaker series.

Speakers

In any given year, the chair must stretch the budget to bring in speakers that the Student Body would like to hear speak. While most shows are sponsored solely by ACCENT, many other student organizations turn to ACCENT for different events. Organizations including, but not limited to, Black Student Union, Jewish Student Union, Hispanic Student Union, Asian American Student Union, Pride Student Union, Islam on Campus, and the Board of College Councils work with ACCENT to bring in speakers who are both relevant to their group and hold wide appeal.

Past speakers

Organizational information

ACCENT has the second-largest budget out of all the agencies, as well as the largest staff. Chapter 563 of the University of Florida Student Body Statues outlines the general practices of the Speakers Bureau.

Over 50 student volunteers work with the chairman to bring speakers to the University of Florida. The chairman is required to appoint three vice chairs, but the remainder of the organizational structure is left up to the chairman. Vice chairships, directorships, and assistant directorships range from productions to promotions and every job in between. Applications are usually found on the official website at the beginning of each semester.

References

External links
University of Florida Student Government
Student Body Statues outlining ACCENT
Accent brings in Kevorkian in St. Pete Times article

University of Florida
Organizations established in 1967
1967 establishments in Florida